The 2003–04 Serie A (known as the Serie A TIM for sponsorship reasons) was the 102nd season of top-tier Italian football, the 72nd in a round-robin tournament. It contained 18 teams for the 16th and last time from the 1988–89 season. With the bottom three being relegated, the 15th placed side would face the sixth-highest team from Serie B, with the winner playing in the Serie A in the subsequent 2004–05 season.

As usual, the top two teams would progress directly to the UEFA Champions League group stage, while third and fourth place would have to begin in the third qualifying round. The UEFA Cup places would be awarded to fifth and sixth place, and the winners of the Coppa Italia.

Milan won their 17th scudetto; Roma impressed and were pushing for the title until the last few weeks of the season; Internazionale only made it to the Champions League ahead of Parma and Lazio on the last day thanks to Adriano, who had been signed from Parma earlier in the season; Lazio won the Coppa Italia against Juventus, handing Udinese the UEFA Cup spot; Ancona were relegated with only two wins, the joint lowest tally ever (Brescia's 12 points in 1994–95 Serie A is still the lowest ever); Empoli and Modena were also relegated; Perugia lost their special play-off, imposed to expand the league, against Fiorentina, who returned to Serie A after a two-year absence.

Ukrainian forward Andriy Shevchenko of Milan was the top scorer, with 24 goals. The 2003–04 league was the last professional season in the career of former European Footballer of the Year and Italian international Roberto Baggio, who finished among the tournament's top ten scorers with 12 goals, and among the all-time top five scorers in Serie A, with 205 career goals. It was also the last Serie A season for Baggio's former teammate Giuseppe Signori, who then moved to the Superleague Greece. Signori ended his career in Italy as the seventh highest scorer ever in Serie A.

Teams
Eighteen teams competed in the league – the top fourteen teams from the previous season and the four teams promoted from the Serie B. The promoted teams were Siena, Sampdoria, Lecce and Ancona. Sampdoria, Lecce and Ancona returned to the top flight after an absence of four, one and ten years respectively, while Siena played in the top flight for the first time in history. They replaced Atalanta (relegated after three seasons in the top flight), Piacenza, Torino (both teams relegated after a two-years presence) and Como (relegated after a season's presence).

Rule changes
Unlike La Liga, which imposed a quota on the number of non-EU players on each club, Serie A clubs could sign as many non-EU players as available on domestic transfer. But for the 2003–04 season a quota was imposed on each of the clubs limiting the number of non-EU, non-EFTA and non-Swiss players who may be signed from abroad each season, following provisional measures introduced in the 2002–03 season, which allowed Serie A & B clubs to sign only one non-EU player in the 2002 summer transfer window.

Personnel and sponsoring 

(*) Promoted from Serie B.

Managerial changes

League table

Results

Qualification play-offs
Perugia had to play a qualification match with 6th-placed team of Serie B, Fiorentina.

Fiorentina won 2–1 on aggregate and were promoted to 2004–05 Serie A; Perugia were relegated to 2004–05 Serie B.

Top goalscorers

Number of teams by region

Season transfers
Summer transfer
Winter transfers
Co-ownerships
Co-ownerships II

References
Almanacco Illustrato del Calcio – La Storia 1898-2004, Panini Edizioni, Modena, September 2005

Footnotes

External links

Italian Wiki-version, with pictures and extra info
Season results, at RSSSF
Season squads, at FootballSquads.com

Serie A seasons
Italy
1